Ballinard is a small townland in the civil parish of Tullagh, County Cork, Ireland.

References

Townlands of County Cork